Squash was among the sports at the 8th All Africa Games held in October 2003 in Abuja, Nigeria. Play featured both a men's and women's singles and team tournaments.

Participating nations

Results

Medalist

References

2003 All-Africa Games
Squash at the African Games